Ronald Allen Eland,  is a Canadian commercial helicopter pilot. He is a "pioneer in the development of high altitude winch rescue and mountain flying techniques". He is Canada's first commercial helicopter pilot who was not previously a fixed-wing pilot.

In 1993, he was made a Member of the Order of Canada. In 1992, he was awarded the Order of British Columbia.

Most of his career was spent working for Trans North Helicopters in Haines Junction, Yukon where he performed many rescues of injured and lost mountain climbers in Kluane National Park, especially at Canada's highest mountain, Mount Logan.

References

Canadian aviators
Members of the Order of British Columbia
Members of the Order of Canada
Living people
Helicopter pilots
Year of birth missing (living people)